Gearóid McInerney (born 24 September 1990) is an Irish hurler who currently plays as a centre-back for the Galway senior team.

Born in Oranmore, County Galway, McInerney was born into a strong hurling family. His father, Gerry McInerney, was a Galway player and won back-to-back All-Ireland medals in 1987 and 1988.

McInerney first played competitive hurling during his schooling at the Oranmore boys national school where he won 2 A county titles in hurling and football. He later played more hurling for Calasanctius College. He simultaneously came to prominence at juvenile and underage levels with the Ornamore-Maree club, before eventually joining the club's top team.

Career
McInerney made his debut on the inter-county scene at the age of twenty when he was selected for the Galway intermediate team. He subsequently joined the Galway under-21 team, winning an All-Ireland medal in 2011. McInerney made his senior debut during the 2014 league and became a regular member of the starting fifteen after a number of seasons. Since then he has won one Leinster medal and one National Hurling League medal.
On 3 September 2017, Galway won their first All-Ireland Senior Hurling Championship in 29 years with McInerney started at centre back.

Career statistics

Honours

Galway
 All-Ireland Senior Hurling Championship (1): 2017
Leinster Senior Hurling Championship (1): 2017
National Hurling League Division 1 (2): 2017, 2021
All-Ireland Under-21 Hurling Championship (1): 2011

Individual
The Sunday Game Team of the Year (1): 2017
The Sunday Game Hurler of the Year (1): 2017
 All-Stars (1): 2017

References

1990 births
Living people
Oranmore-Maree hurlers
Galway inter-county hurlers
Connacht inter-provincial hurlers